Kostas Chaniotakis (Greek: Κώστας Χανιωτάκης; born 19  July 1968) is a retired Greek footballer who played as a goalkeeper.

Career
Chaniotakis moved to the first team at the age of 20 from OFI Crete. After two years he became the first goalkeeper of the club, which he would also be the 8 seasons following. In 1992 and 1993 Chaniotakis came out four times for the Greece national football team.

After having played 228 matches for OFI Crete, the keeper left for the Dutch Vitesse. On the advice of former Vitesse striker Nikos Machlas, the then 30-year-old Chaniotakis and also ex-teammate of Machlas was reached as an experienced stand-in for the first goalkeeper Sander Westerveld. On 29 September 1998, Chaniotakis made his debut for Vitesse in the UEFA Cup-match against the Greek team AEK Athens, because Westerveld was sent out of the field just before the whistle for the half time due to tackling a broken player.

After two seasons in the Netherlands, in which he would play only three games, he returned to his native country to play with the third divisionist Paniliakos. Chaniotakis returned to Crete, and OFI, where he spent another four season as a back-up goalkeeper. He then moved to fellow Heraklion-based Superleague club Ergotelis, and following their relegation, signed with the Cypriot First Division club APOEL Nicosia. At age 37, Chaniotakis postponed his retirement until the end of the season, in order to rejoin Ergotelis in the Beta Ethniki in January 2006, signed as both 4th goalkeeper and goalkeepers' coach.

Statistics

Personal
Chaniotakis' son Georgios is also a goalkeeper. He currently plays for Greek Football League side Ergotelis, where Chaniotakis himself played late in his career.

References

External links
Χανιωτάκης ο κορυφαίος γκολκίπερ του ΟΦΗ!

1968 births
Living people
Greece international footballers
Greek expatriate footballers
Super League Greece players
Eredivisie players
Cypriot First Division players
OFI Crete F.C. players
SBV Vitesse players
Ergotelis F.C. players
APOEL FC players
Expatriate footballers in the Netherlands
Expatriate footballers in Cyprus
Association football goalkeepers
Footballers from Heraklion
Greek footballers